The following is a list of awards and nominations received by Australian actress, producer, and singer-songwriter Toni Collette.

Among her numerous accolades, Collette received five AACTA Awards from eight nominations, a Golden Globe Award from six nominations, a Primetime Emmy Award from four nominations, and a Screen Actors Guild Award from four nominations. She also received nominations for two British Academy Film Awards and the Academy Award for Best Supporting Actress.
 
Collette's breakthrough role came in the comedy-drama Muriel's Wedding (1994), for which she earned her first Golden Globe Award nomination. She achieved greater recognition for The Sixth Sense (1999), for which she was nominated for the Academy Award for Best Supporting Actress. Her Broadway performance in The Wild Party (2000) earned her a nomination for the Tony Award for Best Actress in a Musical. She went on to earn BAFTA Award nominations for About a Boy (2002) and Little Miss Sunshine (2006). For her role in the limited series Tsunami: The Aftermath (2006), she earned her nominations for a Primetime Emmy Award and a Golden Globe Award. Collette earned further acclaim for her lead role in the comedy drama series United States of Tara (2008–2011), for which she won a Primetime Emmy Award and a Golden Globe Award. For the limited series Unbelievable (2019), she received a Critics' Choice Television Award and nominations for a Golden Globe Award and a Primetime Emmy Award.

Major associations

Academy Awards

British Academy Film Awards

Critics' Choice Awards

Primetime Emmy Awards

Golden Globe Awards

Screen Actors Guild Awards

Tony Awards

Other awards

Notes

References

External links
 

Lists of awards received by Australian actor